Arenas Valley is a census-designated place in Grant County, New Mexico, United States. Its population was 1,522 as of the 2010 census. Arenas Valley had a post office from December 20, 1944, to April 20, 1987; it still has its own ZIP code, 88022. It was named because it was in the valley of the Rio de Arenas.

Demographics

References

Census-designated places in New Mexico
Census-designated places in Grant County, New Mexico